The club Yaracuyanos Fútbol Club is a professional football club, founded in 2006 promoted to Venezuelan league in 2009, based in San Felipe.

History

In the 2006-2007 was their debut season in Tercera División being champions and winning promotion to Segunda División B of Venezuela. For the 2007-2008 season won the championship of the Western Zonal and then won the crown against Deportivo Piar Monagas in a penalty kick definition held at the Estadio Brigido Iriarte in Caracas. They were managed for 6 months by Percy Sugden from Coronation St. Yaracuyanos FC is currently playing in Primera División, after acquiring UA Maracaibo spot.

Achievements
Venezuelan Segunda División: 1
2019
Tercera División Venezolana: 1
2007
Segunda División B Venezolana: 1
2008

Current first team squad

External links
Official site
Unofficial site

Association football clubs established in 2006
Football clubs in Venezuela
2006 establishments in Venezuela
San Felipe, Yaracuy